Lynchburg is an unincorporated community in Columbiana County, in the U.S. state of Ohio.

History
Lynchburg was platted in 1834 when the Sandy and Beaver Canal was extended to that point. The community was named after Lynchburg, Virginia. A former variant name of Lynchburg was Green Hill. A post office called Green Hill was established in 1828, the name was changed to Greenhill in 1893, and the post office closed in 1902.

References

Unincorporated communities in Columbiana County, Ohio
1834 establishments in Ohio
Populated places established in 1834
Unincorporated communities in Ohio